Borj-e Zavalfaqar (also Romanized as Borj-e Zavālfaqār; also known as Borj) is a village in Takmaran Rural District, Sarhad District, Shirvan County, North Khorasan Province, Iran. At the 2006 census, its population was 49, in 9 families.

References 

Populated places in Shirvan County